Horst-Dieter Strich (born 8 April 1941) is a German former football player and manager who played as a goalkeeper.

References

1941 births
Living people
German footballers
Association football goalkeepers
Wormatia Worms players
1. FSV Mainz 05 players
1. FC Kaiserslautern players
PSV Eindhoven players
1. FC Nürnberg players
FC Bayern Hof players
Bundesliga players
Eredivisie players
German football managers
Wormatia Worms managers
1. FSV Mainz 05 managers
German expatriate footballers
German expatriate sportspeople in the Netherlands
Expatriate footballers in the Netherlands
Footballers from Berlin